Archidendron grandiflorum, the pink laceflower, is a species of tree found in northern Australia and New Guinea. This tree reaches a height of 15 meters and bears showy pink and cream colored flowers. The mature tree has a rounded habit and is used as an ornamental. This tree is also called the lace flower tree, paintbrush tree, tassel tree, and tulip siris.

References

External links  
  Archidendron grandiflorum
  Photo of flower

grandiflorum
Flora of New South Wales
Flora of Queensland
Plants described in 1864